was a Japanese voice actor. He was originally from Hokkaidō. Senda was affiliated with 81 Produce.

Senda died from heart failure on February 25, 2023, at the age of 82.

Filmography

Television animation
Time Bokan (1975) - Ninja
Sherlock Hound (1984) - Smiley
YuYu Hakusho (1992) - Seiryu
Kaleido Star (2003) - Mr. Kenneth
07-Ghost (2007) - Miroku
Naruto (2006) - Shinayakana
Naruto: Shippuden (2009) - Gamamaru
Needless (2009) - Ishiyama
Zetman (2012) - Gorō Kanzaki
Maho Girls PreCure! (2016) – Hook
Beyblade Burst (2017) - Zoro / Raul Comas
Demon Warrior Koji (1999) - Shuichi Kotani

Dubbing

Live-action
Lance Henriksen
The Terminator (1987 TV Asahi and 1992 VHS editions) (Detective Hal Vukovich)
Jagged Edge (1989 TV Asahi edition) (Frank Martin)
Aliens (1988 TBS edition) (Bishop)
Stone Cold (Chains Cooper)
Klaus Kinski
Creature (Hans Rudy Hofner)
Commando Leopard (1987 TV Tokyo edition) (Silveira)
Code Name: Wild Geese (1988 TV Tokyo edition) (Charlton)
The Terminator (1987 TV Asahi edition) (Detective Hal Vukovich)
Harry Dean Stanton
Alien (1992 TV Asahi edition) (Brett)
Christine (1990 TV Asahi edition) (Detective Rudolph "Rudy" Junkins)
Pretty in Pink (Jack Walsh)
Twin Peaks: Fire Walk with Me (Carl Rodd)
Barry Otto
The Punisher (Shake)
Mr. Nice Guy (1999 NTV edition) (Baggio)
Love's Brother (Father Alfredo)
48 Hrs. (1990 NTV edition) (Albert Ganz (James Remar))
The Abyss (Lieutenant Hiram Coffey (Michael Biehn))
Ace Ventura: When Nature Calls (Vincent Cadby (Simon Callow))
The Adventures of Buckaroo Banzai Across the 8th Dimension (Secretary of Defense McKinley (Matt Clark), John Gomez (Dan Hedaya))
Best in Show (Gerry Fleck (Eugene Levy))
The Bodyguard (Greg Portman (Tomas Arana))
Born on the Fourth of July (1993 TV Asahi edition) (Charlie (Willem Dafoe))
Clear and Present Danger (Colonel Félix Cortez (Joaquim de Almeida))
The Crow (T-Bird (David Patrick Kelly))
Das Boot (1983 Fuji TV edition) (Bootsmann Lamprecht (Uwe Ochsenknecht))
The Driver (1980 NTV edition) (Teeth (Rudy Ramos))
End of Days (Thomas Aquinas (Derrick O'Connor))
Extreme Prejudice (1988 Fuji TV edition) (Deputy Cortez (Marco Rodríguez))
Felon (Gordon (Sam Shepard))
Firewall (Arlin Forester (Alan Arkin))
Gattaca (German (Tony Shalhoub))
Hard Times (1981 TV Asahi edition) (Le Beau (Felice Orlandi))
The Hunt for Red October (1993 TBS edition) (Commander Bartolomeo Vito Mancuso (Scott Glenn))
In the Mouth of Madness (Sutter Cane (Jürgen Prochnow))
Just Cause (Blair Sullivan (Ed Harris))
The Killer (Sgt. Tsang Yeh (Kenneth Tsang))
King Ralph (Lord Percival Graves (John Hurt))
Last Action Hero (The Ripper (Tom Noonan))
Last Man Standing (1998 TV Asahi edition) (Gas station attendant (Raynor Scheine))
The Long Riders (1988 TV Asahi edition) (Charley Ford (Christopher Guest))
NCIS (Dr. Donald "Ducky" Mallard (David McCallum))
The NeverEnding Story (1987 TV Asahi edition) (Teeny Weeny (Deep Roy))
Pearl Harbor (Husband E. Kimmel (Colm Feore))
Platoon (1989 TV Asahi edition) (Sergeant O'Neill (John C. McGinley))
Red Heat (1990 TV Asahi edition) (Abdul Elijah (Brent Jennings))
Ronin (Seamus O'Rourke (Jonathan Pryce))
Scrooged (Brice Cummings (John Glover))
Tucker: The Man and His Dream (Eddie Dean (Frederic Forrest))
The Warriors (1982 NTV edition) (Snow (Brian Tyler))
Welcome to Sarajevo (Michael Henderson (Stephen Dillane))
X-Men (Senator Robert Kelly (Bruce Davison))
X2 (Senator Robert Kelly (Bruce Davison))
Zodiac: Signs of the Apocalypse (Harry Setag (Christopher Lloyd))

Animated
Watership Down (BlackBerry)

References

External links

1940 births
2023 deaths
81 Produce voice actors
Japanese male voice actors
Male voice actors from Hokkaido